Romana Acosta Bañuelos (March 20, 1925 – January 15, 2018) was the thirty-fourth Treasurer of the United States. Appointed by President Richard Nixon on September 20, 1971, she served from December 17, 1971, to February 14, 1974.

Born into a poor family of Mexican-Americans, Acosta became the first Hispanic treasurer of the United States (1971–1974) and owner of a multimillion-dollar business, Ramona's Mexican Food Products, Inc. headquartered in Gardena, California. She also co-founded the Pan American National Bank in East Los Angeles.

Early life
Acosta, daughter of poor Mexican immigrants, was born in the mining town of Miami, Arizona, on March 20, 1925, to Juan Francisco Acosta and Teresa Lugo. In 1933, during the Great Depression, the U.S. government deported her family, and thousands of other Mexican-Americans, even though many of the deportees, like Acosta, had been born in the United States (and were thus, according to the 14th Amendment, U.S. citizens not legally subject to deportation). The Acostas believed the deportation officials' statement that they could return as soon as the country's economy had improved, so they accepted the government's offer to pay for their moving expenses and left their home peacefully.

They moved in with relatives who owned a small ranch in the Mexican state of Sonora. Along with her parents, Acosta began rising early to tend the crops that her father and other male relatives had planted. She helped her mother in the kitchen as well, making empanadas that her mother sold to bakeries and restaurants to make extra money. Acosta later recalled that her mother, who also raised chickens for their eggs, "was the type of woman who taught us how to live in any place and work with what we have." She called her mother a resourceful businesswoman who presented a strong role model for what a woman could do economically with very little.

Acosta married Martin Torres in Mexico at age 16, not an unusually young age in that culture at the time. She had two sons, Carlos and Martin, by age 18. She returned to the United States with her children. Some reports speculate she worked in an El Paso, Texas, laundromat for a time, while others say she followed an aunt to Los Angeles. Most accounts describe Acosta arriving in Los Angeles, California, with her children, unable to speak English and with only seven dollars to her name.

Career

Ramona's Mexican Food Products
Working as a dishwasher by day and as a tortilla maker from midnight to 6 a.m., Acosta soon made enough money to save some. At 21, she married Alejandro Bañuelos and saved about $500, which she used to start a tortilla factory in downtown Los Angeles. Acosta bought a tortilla machine, a fan, and a corn grinder, and with her aunt helping her she made $36 on the factory's first day of business in 1949.

Ambitious and driven, Acosta constantly sought opportunities to sell her tortillas to local businesses. As sales volume increased, she incorporated the company and named it Ramona's Mexican Food Products, Inc. There are differing opinions on how the business name came about: some say the sign painters made a mistake when spelling "Romana"; others insist "Ramona" was an early California folk hero; and still others believe it was a product of people's unfamiliarity with the name "Romana." By the mid-1960s, Ramona's Mexican Food Products, Inc. was thriving and Acosta had a daughter, whom she named Ramona after the business.

Pan-American National Bank
In 1963, looking for ways to help the struggling Latinos in her neighborhood, Acosta and some businessmen founded the Pan-American National Bank in East Los Angeles, California. The men had initially approached her husband with the proposal, but he was busy with political work and suggested the men talk to Acosta. The bank's main purpose was to bankroll Latinos who wanted to start their own businesses. Acosta also believed that if Hispanics could increase their financial base they would have more political influence and be able to improve their standard of living.

In 1969 Acosta was appointed chairperson of the bank's board of directors and received the city's Outstanding Business Woman of the Year Award. Later that year, Mayor Sam Yorty presented her with a commendation from the County Board of Supervisors, and Acosta established a college scholarship fund, the Ramona Mexican Food Products Scholarship, for poor Mexican-American students.

United States Treasurer
With bank assets already in the millions and deposits climbing rapidly, Pan-American National's success caught the attention of the Richard Nixon's administration. The president was seeking to repay the Republican National Hispanic Assembly, which had played a strong role in his election. Acosta agreed to the nomination when asked in 1970 if she would consider the office of U.S. Treasurer. She was stunned when Nixon personally chose her as his candidate.

During the nomination process, Acosta was taken aback by a sudden raid on her tortilla factory by U.S. Immigration Service agents. The agents, contrary to their usual methods, reportedly carried out a loud, disruptive raid through the facility, attracting a lot of press attention. However, Nixon sided with her and called the raid politically motivated, charging the Democratic Party with instigating it. She was later vindicated when a Senate investigation ruled that the raid was carried out solely to cause embarrassment to the Nixon administration.

Despite the ugly affair, Acosta sailed through the confirmation process to become the nation's 34th Treasurer and the first Latina Treasurer in U.S. history. She took office on December 17, 1971, becoming the highest-ranking Mexican-American in the government.  Her daughter said of Acosta's performance, "My mother's legacy is that she ran the place as a business, not just as another wing of the government."

Acosta Bañuelos served as treasurer until 1974, by which time Nixon was embroiled in the Watergate affair and would soon resign the presidency to be replaced by Gerald Ford. She resigned as treasurer earlier in the year to return to her businesses, family, and philanthropic pursuits. She said during a 1979 interview with Nuestro magazine, "It was a beautiful experience. I will always be grateful to President Nixon." Later that year, Acosta was a founding member of Executive Women in Government.

By 1979, Ramona's was making and distributing 22 different food products. It had more than 400 employees and sales of $12 million a year. The company's success was instrumental in the popularization of Mexican cuisine in the United States. As the Hispanic population of the country grew, so did sales of tortillas, empanadas, and many other traditional favorites. Other ethnic groups began to favor the inexpensive, delicious foods as well, boosting the company's profits. Ramona's continued to grow throughout the 1980s, when it became one of the largest distributors and manufacturers of Mexican food in California.

Later life
Throughout the 1980s and 1990s, Acosta continued to serve as president of Ramona's and Pan-American National, and by 1992, she had served three terms as chair of the bank's board of directors. In the late 1990s she allowed her three children to take over daily operations of Ramona's and to play large roles in the bank's operations.

Acosta Bañuelos remained CEO at Pan-American National and president of Ramona's, running both businesses from her Los Angeles home. The Acosta family owned two-thirds of the shares in the publicly-traded bank. Pan-American National Bank is credited with helping economically troubled East Los Angeles develop a sense of community and with being a factor in the economic improvement of its Latino population.

Acosta Bañuelos died January 15, 2018, in Redondo Beach, California.

Awards
 Outstanding Business Woman of the Year, City of Los Angeles, 1969.
 Commendation Award, County of Los Angeles, 1969.
 Woman Achievement Award, The East Los Angeles Community Union, 1977.
 Lifetime Achievement Award, Latino Business Chamber of Greater Los Angeles, 2011.

References

Further reading
 "A few good women" Oral history at Penn State University Libraries
 

1925 births
2018 deaths
American bankers
American politicians of Mexican descent
American women business executives
American business executives
California Republicans
People from Miami, Arizona
Politicians from Los Angeles
Treasurers of the United States
American women bankers
American food company founders
American chairpersons of corporations
American women company founders
Hispanic and Latino American women in politics
Chairwomen
21st-century American women